These are the results of the men's K-1 1000 metres competition in canoeing at the 2004 Summer Olympics. The K-1 event is raced by single-man canoe sprint kayaks.

Medalists

Heats
The 25 competitors first raced in three heats.  The top finisher in each heat moved directly to the final, and the next six finishers in each heat moved to the semifinals.  The heats were raced on August 23. 
Tim Brabants' time of 3:24.412 was the World's fastest until 2011.

Semifinals
The top three finishers in each of the two semifinals qualified for the final.  Fourth place and higher competitors were eliminated.   The semifinals were raced on August 25.

Final
The final was raced on August 27.

References
2004 Summer Olympics Canoe sprint results 
Sports-reference.com 2004 K-1 1000 m results.
Yahoo! Sports Athens 2004 Summer Olympics Canoe/Kayak Results

Men's K-1 1000
Men's events at the 2004 Summer Olympics